
Year 421 BC was a year of the pre-Julian Roman calendar. At the time, it was known in Rome as the Year of the Consulship of Vibulanus and Barbatus (or, less frequently, year 333 Ab urbe condita). The denomination 421 BC for this year has been used since the early medieval period, when the Anno Domini calendar era became the prevalent method in Europe for naming years.

Events 
 By place 
 Greece 
 Nicias, the leader of the aristocratic and peace party in Athens and Pleistoanax, King of Sparta, negotiate the Peace of Nicias between Athens and Sparta, which brings a temporary end to the Peloponnesian War. The essence of the Peace of Nicias is a return to the antebellum period with most wartime gains being returned. Seventeen representatives from each side swear an oath to uphold the treaty, which is meant to last for one generation (30 years: meaning they are not responsible for the next generation's decision). All of Sparta's allies agree to sign the peace except for the Boeotians, Corinth, Elis, and Megara.
 Alcibiades engineers an anti-Spartan alliance between Athens and the democracies of Argos, Mantinea and Elis.

 Italy 
 The city of Cumae, the most northerly of the Greek colonies in Italy, falls to the Samnites.

 By topic 
 Art 
 The construction of the Porch of the Maidens (the Caryatid Porch) commences at the Erechtheion which is part of the Acropolis in Athens.

 Drama 
 Aristophanes' play The Peace is performed.

Births

Deaths 
 Cratinus, Greek comedy author (approximate date) (b. 520 BC)

References